The Udine shrew (Sorex arunchi) is a species of mammal in the family Soricidae. It is found in the Udine province of north-east Italy and in western Slovenia.

References

 Lapini L, Testone R (1998) A new Sorex from north-eastern Italy (Mammalia: Insectivora: Soricidae). Gortania Atti Museo Friul di Storia Nat 20:233-252 (1998).
 IUCN Red List of Threatened Species

Sorex
Mammals of Europe
Mammals described in 1998